Jorge Luis Aguilar Miranda (born 4 February 1993) is a Paraguayan professional footballer who plays as an defender for Bangladesh Premier League club Sheikh Jamal Dhanmondi Club.

References

External links
 
 
 

Living people
1993 births
Paraguayan footballers
Association football defenders
General Caballero Sport Club footballers
Deportivo Santaní players
Querétaro F.C. footballers
Club Tijuana footballers
Paraguayan Primera División players
Liga MX players
Paraguayan expatriate footballers
Paraguayan expatriate sportspeople in Mexico
Expatriate footballers in Mexico
Sheikh Jamal Dhanmondi Club players
Bangladesh Football Premier League players
Expatriate footballers in Bangladesh
People from Paraguarí